Mount Taung Wine (literally translates to 'round mountain', တောင်ဝိုင်း) is a mountain in Myanmar. It is located to the east of Hpa-An, Kayin State. The top of Taung Wine is 313 metres (1027 ft) above sea level. At the summit of Taung Wine Hill, Lawkawidu Pagoda (လောကဝိဓူစေတီ) marks the top. Taung Wine is a tourist destination and famous for its views and natural environment. After passing through 3 scenic spots while climbing, there is a steel stairway that has a slight resemblance to the Stairway to Heaven stairs in Hawaii, that goes up to the top of the mountain.

Gallery

See also
Taung Wine Hill bent-toed gecko

References 

Hills of Myanmar
Buddhist pilgrimage sites in Myanmar